Dipsas ellipsifera is a non-venomous snake found in Ecuador and Colombia.

References

Dipsas
Snakes of South America
Reptiles of Colombia
Reptiles of Ecuador
Reptiles described in 1898
Taxa named by George Albert Boulenger